Davit Bakradze (born 30 December 1975) is a Georgian diplomat and politician. In October 2016, Bakradze was appointed Ambassador of Georgia to the United States.  Prior to his appointment as ambassador, Bakradze served as State Minister for Euro-Atlantic Integration of Georgia from 2014 to 2016

Biography 
Ambassador Bakradze has a long and distinguished career in diplomatic service. Since 2002, he has served in a number of senior official posts in Georgian public service. Prior to his appointment as Ambassador to the U.S., Ambassador Bakradze served as the State Minister of Georgia for European and Euro-Atlantic Integration. In that role, he was responsible for the implementation of the Government of Georgia's activities related to European and Euro-Atlantic integration. In particular, he was in charge of coordinating the Government's work on implementing key instruments of integration, such as the EU-Georgia Association Agreement (AA), the Eastern Partnership with the EU, the Annual National Program (ANP) and the NATO-Georgia Commission (NGC). He also coordinated Strategic Communication and European Assistance Programs for the Government of Georgia. Ambassador Bakradze's career includes a number of notable and senior positions. In addition to State Minister for European and Euro-Atlantic Integration (2014 – 2016), he served as Ambassador to the Hellenic Republic and the Republic of Serbia (2012 – 2014); Senior Counsellor and Chargé d'Affaires at the Georgian Embassy in the Republic of Finland (2008 – 2012); Head of First European Division, Ministry of Foreign Affairs (2005 – 2008); Counselor of the Permanent Mission of Georgia to the U.N. and Embassy in the Swiss Confederation (2002—2005); advisor in the National Security Council of Georgia covering Human Rights, Information and Analysis, Law Enforcement Institutions (1997 – 2002); staff member in the press office for the office of the President of Georgia (1996 – 1997). Ambassador Bakradze graduated from Tbilisi State University with a degree in International Economic Relations and International Law. He speaks Georgian, English and Russian. Ambassador Bakradze is married to Anna Matsukashvili. They have three children.

References

1975 births
Government ministers of Georgia (country)
Diplomats from Tbilisi
Politicians from Tbilisi
Tbilisi State University alumni
Living people
Ambassadors of Georgia (country) to the United States